Vrontero (before 1926: Γκράσδενι – Gkrasdeni) is a village in the Florina Regional Unit in West Macedonia, Greece.

Demographics 
In the early 1900s, 276 Slavonic speaking Christians lived in the village. Aromanians settled in the village in 1949. They were a group of nomadic transhumant Aromanians (known as the Arvanitovlachs) originating from Thessaly and the Greek government assisted their settlement into depopulated villages of the Prespa region like Vrontero. Aromanians are the only inhabitants of the village.

Vrontero had 172 inhabitants in 1981. In fieldwork done by Riki Van Boeschoten in late 1993, Vrontero was populated by Aromanians. The Aromanian language was used by people of all ages, both in public and private settings, and as the main language for interpersonal relationships. Some elderly villagers had little knowledge of Greek.

References

External links
Prespes website

Populated places in Florina (regional unit)